Sander Gillé and Joran Vliegen were the defending champions but chose not to defend their title.

Sander Arends and Tristan-Samuel Weissborn won the title after defeating David Pel and Antonio Šančić 6–4, 6–4 in the final.

Seeds

Draw

References
 Main draw

Open de Rennes - Doubles
2019 Doubles